Mohamed Gayth was a colonel for the forces of former Libyan leader Muammar Gaddafi, during the 2011 Libyan civil war, before their defeat and Gaddafi's death in Sirte. Gayth was reported to be killed in the First Battle of Zawiya in March 2011 as Pro-Gaddafi forces took the city. It was claimed that a Brigadier-general, Muftah Anaqrat was killed alongside him.

References

2011 deaths
Libyan colonels
Libyan military personnel killed in action
People killed in the First Libyan Civil War
Year of birth missing